In freshwater or marine systems apparent oxygen utilization (AOU) is the difference between oxygen gas solubility (i.e. the concentration at saturation) and the measured oxygen concentration in water with the same physical and chemical properties.

General influences 
Differences in O2 solubility and measured concentration (AOU) typically occur when biological activity, ocean circulation, or ocean mixing act to change the ambient concentration of oxygen. For example, primary production liberates oxygen and increases its concentration, while respiration consumes it and decreases its concentration.

Consequently, the AOU of a water sample represents the sum of the biological activity that the sample has experienced since it was last in equilibrium with the atmosphere. In shallow water systems (e.g. lakes), the full water column is generally in close contact with the atmosphere, and oxygen concentrations are typically close to saturation, and AOU values are near zero. In deep water systems (e.g. oceans), water can be out of contact with the atmosphere for extremely long periods of time (years, decades, centuries) and large positive AOU values are typical. On occasion, where near-surface primary production has raised oxygen concentrations above saturation, negative AOU values are possible (i.e. oxygen has not been utilized to below saturation concentrations).

O2 trends and AOU in the ocean 
O2 concentrations in the ocean have decreased since the 1980s. Part of this decrease is due to increased ocean heat content (OHC) from global warming decreasing O2 solubility. As solubility in surface oceans decreases, O2 out gasses to the atmosphere.  Increased AOU is likely also contributing to declining ocean O2 concentrations. Changes in AOU in the ocean could be caused by multiple forcings, such as changes in subduction rates, changes in water mass boundaries, initial O2 from water mass formation, biochemical consumption of O2, or changes in eddy mixing. Based on observations, global AOU increase seems to be linked to increasing OHC.

Spatial trends in AOU and O2 
Changes in AOU are not consistent across spatial domains. Notably, the Northern Hemisphere AOU spikes in the mid-1990s, while Southern Hemisphere AOU significantly decreases in the mid-2000s. This could be due to less dense data in the Southern Hemisphere. Since the 80s, regions of major O2 decrease (AOU increase) include the subpolar North Pacific, equatorial Atlantic, and eastern equatorial Pacific. Regions of O2 increase (AOU decrease) include the western subtropical North Pacific and eastern subpolar North Atlantic.

See also

 Biological pump
 Eutrophication
 Lake metabolism
 Stream metabolism
 Hypoxia
 Remineralisation
 World Ocean Atlas
 Deep ocean water
 Thermohaline circulation
 Phytoplankton

References

Biological oceanography
Geochemistry
Limnology
Oceanography
Oxygen